CH Media is a Swiss media company which was founded in 2018 as a joint venture of the AZ Medien and the NZZ Media Group. It has about 2000 employees and generates sales of almost CHF 500 million.

History 
On December 7, 2017, AZ Medien and the NZZ Media Group announced the formation of the joint venture, which is owned equally by both groups. The two media companies contributed their regional newspapers and associated online portals as well as their radio and television stations to the new CH Media company. AZ Medien's magazines were also added to the network. The NZZ Media Group contributed its entire regional media business. Printing plants such as Mittelland Zeitungsdruck, NZZ Media Services and Vogt-Schild as well as all employees and managers in the above-mentioned areas of both media groups were also transferred to the new company. The NZZ Media and Business Media divisions of the NZZ Media Group, including the Neue Zürcher Zeitung and NZZ am Sonntag, are not part of the merger.

Media 
The joint venture reaches about 2 million people with all its media.

Newspapers 
CH Media publishes six regional newspapers from AZ Medien and two from NZZ Media Group. Including their head pages, these are around 20 paid newspapers in 15 German-speaking cantons with a paid circulation of almost 370,000 copies and a reach of around 1 million readers:

 az Aargauer Zeitung Aarau (with editions for Brugg, the Freiamt and the Fricktal as well as a remote edition)
 az Badener Tagblatt
 az Limmattaler Zeitung
 az Solothurner Zeitung
 az Grenchner Tagblatt
 ot Oltner Tagblatt
 bz Basellandschaftliche Zeitung
 bz Basel

Together with the cooperation partner Zofinger Tagblatt, these newspapers and regional editions form az Nordwestschweiz and are published as printed daily newspapers and online.

 Luzerner Zeitung, until June 2019 with Zentralschweiz am Sonntag
 Zuger Zeitung
 Nidwaldner Zeitung
 Obwaldner Zeitung
 Urner Zeitung
 St. Galler Tagblatt, with editions for the regions St. Gallen, Gossau and Rorschach, until June 2019 with Ostschweiz am Sonntag
 Thurgauer Zeitung
 Toggenburger Tagblatt
 Appenzeller Zeitung
 Wiler Zeitung
 Werdenberger & Obertoggenburger
 Schweiz am Wochenende: Launched in 2007, the Sunday newspaper, which was published from 2013 to 2017 together with Südostschweiz Medien with eight regional editions under the title Switzerland on Sonntag, was replaced from February 2017 by Schweiz am Wochenende, which is published every Saturday. Since July 2019, its cover has also been used by the St. Galler Tagblatt and the Luzerner Zeitung as a replacement for their Sunday newspapers Ostschweiz am Sonntag and Zentralschweiz am Sonntag

Television 

 Tele M1
 Tele Bärn
 TeleZüri
 TV24
 TV25
 3+
 4+
 5+
 6+
 S1
 Tele 1
 TVO
 Belcom AG (marketing company)
 7+ Family / Nick Schweiz

Radio 

 Radio Argovia
 Radio 24
 Radio FM1
 Radio Pilatus
 Radio Melody
 Virgin Radio Hits Switzerland
 Virgin Radio Rock Switzerland

On July 1, 2018, AZ Medien and the NZZ Media Group returned the licences of their four radio stations Radio Argovia and Radio 24 (AZ Medien) as well as Radio FM1 and Radio Pilatus (NZZ Media Group), which enabled their transfer to CH Media.

Online 
All online portals of the newspapers concerned were also integrated into the new company. One exception is the online newspaper Watson, which still needs entrepreneurial freedom as a start-up company, but could be integrated later.

Management 
Peter Wanner is President of the board of directors of CH Media (Vice chairman Jörg Schnyder, chief financial officer of the NZZ Media Group), Axel Wüstmann is CEO of AZ Medien (deputy chairman Jürg Weber, Head of the NZZ Regional Media), and journalistic director is the former journalistic director of the NZZ regional media, Pascal Hollenstein.

Critique 
It is controversially judged whether the merger would lead to a strengthening of the alleged "unity circle" in the Swiss media or, thanks to a powerful editorial staff that has the time and the financial means to be able to research precisely the opposite (Pascal Hollenstein at the media conference). Mergers actually strengthened critical journalism (Kurt W. Zimmermann).

References 



External links

Mass media companies of Switzerland